Jesus the Risen Savior School is a De La Salle-supervised school in the Philippines.

References 

Schools in San Pedro, Laguna